Statistics of Swiss Super League in the 1904–05 season.

East

Central

NB: the match FC Basel - Young Boys Bern ended with the final score 3-4. Falsely, however, the result was originally reported as a 4-4 draw. Thus Old Boys would have finished in first position and were nominated as participants for the finals. After the mistake was noticed the W-D-L records and points totals in the league table were corrected and the necessary play-off match was arranged. However, the total goals remained without modification and consequently this leads to the fact that most older sources list the goal records for Young Boys and FC Basel as 35-11 and 19-20 respectively. Obviously this is arithmetically incorrect.

Play-off

|}

West

Play-off

|}

Final

Table

Results 

|colspan="3" style="background-color:#D0D0D0" align=center|2 April 1905

|-
|colspan="3" style="background-color:#D0D0D0" align=center|9 April 1905

|-
|colspan="3" style="background-color:#D0D0D0" align=center|16 April 1905

|}

Grasshopper Club Zürich won the championship.

Sources 
 Switzerland 1904-05 at RSSSF

Seasons in Swiss football
Swiss Football League seasons
1904–05 in Swiss football
Swiss